United Metal Maniacs is an extreme metal festival held annually since 2003 in Bitterfeld, Germany.

Lineups

2006
 June 3–4, 2006: Decayed, Desaster, Deströyer 666, Dekapitator, Helrunar, Infernal War, Mental Horror, Nebular Mystic, Primordial, Secrets of the Moon, Warhammer.

2007
 May 26–27, 2007: Adorior, Anael, Archgoat, Black Witchery, Bullet, Delirium Tremens, Denial of God, Razor of Occam, Unpure.

2008
 May 10–11, 2008: Angelcorpse, Arkhon Infaustus, Barbatos, Code, Dissimulation, Enforcer, Enslaved, Flesh Made Sin, Nifelheim, Purgatory, Ravencult, Revenge, Root, Sólstafir, Svartahrid, Tyrant, The Battalion, Witchmaster.

2009

2010
 May 22–23, 2010: Trident, The Stone, Vomitor, Gospel of the Horns, Gehenna, Tulus, Baphomet's Blood, Die Hard, Sahg, Affliction Gate, Nachtmystium, Ketzer, Nocturnal, Negura Bunget, Kill, The Jailbreakers

References

External links
 Festival website

Heavy metal festivals in Germany
Music festivals established in 2003